Captain Donald Cameron of Lochiel (25 September 1796 – 4 January 1859) was a British soldier, distinguished in the Waterloo campaign. The 23rd Lochiel of Clan Cameron, he was additionally the grandson of famed general Sir Ralph Abercromby and the Baroness Abercromby of Aboukir.

Early life and career 
Born at Kinnaird House, Stirlingshire in 1796, the son of Donald Cameron, 22nd Lochiel by his wife Hon. Anne Abercromby, eldest daughter of Sir Ralph Abercromby. He was educated at Harrow School, where all future Cameron chiefs would be educated. In 1814 Lochiel gained the rank of an officer in the Grenadier Guards, and would fight at the Battle of Waterloo on 18 June 1815. He held the office of Deputy Lieutenant and the position of 23rd Chief "Lochiel" of the Clan Cameron.

Marriage and children 
In 1832 Lochiel married Vere Hobart, sister of George Hampden Hobart, 5th Earl of Buckinghamshire of Hampden House, with whom he had the following children:

 Anne Louisa Cameron (1833–1864)

 Donald Cameron, 24th Lochiel (1835-1905)
 Julia Vere Cameron (1837–1921)
 George Hampden Cameron (1840–1877)
 Sybella Cameron (died 1890)
 Albinia Cameron (died 1861).

References 

1796 births
1859 deaths
Scottish clan chiefs
Clan Cameron
19th-century Scottish people
People educated at Harrow School
Grenadier Guards officers
British Army personnel of the Napoleonic Wars